Charles Edward Potter (October 30, 1916November 23, 1979) was a U.S. Representative and a U.S. Senator from the state of Michigan.

Early life
Potter was born in Lapeer, Michigan and attended the public schools there. He received an AB degree from Eastern Michigan University, Ypsilanti, Michigan, in 1938. He worked as an administrator of Bureau of Social Aid in Cheboygan County, Michigan, 1938–1942. In 1942, he enlisted as a private in the United States Army with combat service in the European Theater of Operations with the US 28th Infantry Division. He was seriously wounded at Colmar, Alsace, France, in 1945, resulting in the loss of both legs. He was discharged from the service as a major in 1946.

He was awarded the Silver Star twice, the French Croix de Guerre, and the U.S. Purple Heart. After the war, he was engaged as a vocational rehabilitation representative for the Retraining and Reemployment Administration with the United States Labor Department until his resignation in 1947.

Congress

Potter was elected on August 26, 1947, as a Republican to the United States House of Representatives from Michigan's 11th congressional district for the 80th Congress to fill the vacancy caused by the death of Fred Bradley. He was reelected to the two succeeding Congresses and served from August 26, 1947, until his resignation November 4, 1952.

He was elected to the United States Senate in 1952 to fill the vacancy caused by the death of Arthur H. Vandenberg, replacing Blair Moody, who had been appointed to the post. He served the remainder of Vandenberg's term, from November 5, 1952, to January 3, 1953. He was also elected in 1952 for the term commencing January 3, 1953, defeating Moody in both elections. He served until January 3, 1959, having been defeated for reelection to a second term in 1958 by Philip Hart.

Potter voted in favor of the Civil Rights Act of 1957.

During his tenure, he served as the only member of the Subcommittee on Korean War Atrocities, investigating war crimes committed during the Korean War.

Later career
After leaving Congress, Potter engaged as an industrial consultant and international securities executive. In his 1965 memoir, Days of Shame, he outlined the battle between moderate Republicans and Democrats to contend with Sen. Joseph R. McCarthy. Potter was a close confidante of President Dwight D. Eisenhower on this and other issues.

Potter was a Methodist and a member of American Legion, Amvets, Disabled American Veterans, Veterans of Foreign Wars, Eagles, Elks, Kiwanis, and the American Battle Monuments Commission.  He resided in Queenstown, Maryland, until his death at Walter Reed Army Hospital, Washington, D.C. at the age of sixty-three.

Charles E. Potter is interred in Section 30 of Arlington National Cemetery, Fort Myer, Virginia.

Bibliography
Potter, Charles E. Days of Shame. New York: Coward-McCann, 1965.

See also

 List of members of the House Un-American Activities Committee

Notes

References
 Retrieved on 2008-02-05
The Political Graveyard

External links
Arlington National Cemetery
 

1916 births
1979 deaths
United States Army officers
United States Army personnel of World War II
Recipients of the Silver Star
Eastern Michigan University alumni
American amputees
Burials at Arlington National Cemetery
Recipients of the Croix de Guerre 1939–1945 (France)
American politicians with disabilities
Republican Party United States senators from Michigan
Methodists from Michigan
20th-century American writers
Republican Party members of the United States House of Representatives from Michigan
Articles containing video clips
20th-century American politicians
People from Lapeer, Michigan
Maryland Republicans